Two Counts of Revilla Gigedo served as Viceroys of New Spain:

 Don Juan Francisco de Güemes, 1st Count of Revillagigedo (1681–1766), was the Viceroy of New Spain from 1746 to 1755.
 His son, Don Juan Vicente de Güemes Padilla Horcasitas y Aguayo, 2nd Count of Revillagigedo, (1738–1799), born in Havana, Cuba, was Viceroy of New Spain from 1789 to 1794.

Rivella Gigedo, conde de
 
Revilla Gigedo